Frank Sidney Hagney (20 March 1884 – 25 June 1973) was an Australian actor. He is known for his work on It's a Wonderful Life (1946), Ride Him, Cowboy (1932) and The Sea Beast (1926).

Early and career
Born in Sydney, New South Wales in 1884, Hagney appeared in more than 350 Hollywood films between 1919 and 1966. Most of his film roles were small and uncredited. Because of his tall and strong appearance, Hagney often played officers or henchmen. He is perhaps best-known as Mr. Potter's silent, wheelchair-pushing valet in Frank Capra's classic It's a Wonderful Life (1946). Hagney was also a guest star on more than 70 television programs such as The Cisco Kid, The Adventures of Kit Carson, The Lone Ranger, The Rifleman, Perry Mason, and Daniel Boone. In 1956 he appeared as a Townsman in an uncredited role in the TV western Cheyenne in the episode titled "The Last Train West."

He starred in The Fighting Marine (1926) with Jack Anthony, Joe Bonomo and Walter Miller; The Fighting Sap (1924) with Bob Fleming, Hazel Keener, Wilfred Lucas and Fred Thomson; The Ghost in the Garret (1921), Ghost Town Gold (1936), Go Get 'Em Hutch (1922) with Richard R. Neil; Ride Him Cowboy (1932) with Eddie Gribbon and John Wayne, Valley of the Lawless (1936), and Vultures of the Sea (1928) with Joseph Bennett.

His 42 silent films included The Battler (1919), The Breed of the Border (1924), The Dangerous Coward (1924), Galloping Gallagher (1924), Lighting Romance (1924), The Mask of Lopez (1924), The Silent Stranger (1924), The Wild Bull's Lair (1925), Lone Hand Saunders (1926) and The Two-Gun Man (1926). His 54 sound western film included The Phantom of the West (1931), Fighting Caravans (1931), The Squaw Man (1931), The Golden West (1932), Honor of the Range (1934), Western Frontier, Heroes of the Range (1936), Billy the Kid, The Lone Rider Rides On (1941), Blazing Frontier (1943) and The Wistful Widow of Wagon Gap (1947). His last two films were McLintock! (1963) and Come Blow Your Horn (1963).

Personal life
Hagney was married to Edna Shephard. He died in Los Angeles in 1973. He is buried at Forest Lawn Memorial Park, Glendale.

Filmography

 The Battler (1919) – 'Spike' Kelly
 The Whirlwind (1920)
 The Gauntlet (1920) – Buck Higby
 The Ghost in the Garret (1921) – Crook
 Anne of Little Smoky (1921) – Ed Brockton
 Go Get 'Em Hutch (1921)
 Outcast (1922)
 Backbone (1923) – The Indian
 Galloping Gallagher (1924) – Joseph Burke
 The Mask of Lopez (1924)- Steve Gore / Lopez
 The Martyr Sex (1924) – Ed Carter
 The Silent Stranger (1924) – Dick Blackwell
 The Dangerous Coward (1924) – Wildcat Rex
 Fight and Win (1924) – Spike McGann – Prizefighting Opponent
 The Fighting Sap (1924) – Nebraska Brent
 Poison (1924) – Joe Tracey
 Hit and Run (1924) – Tough Guy
 Roaring Rails (1924) – Red Burley
 Lightning Romance (1924) – Arizona Joe
 The Lighthouse by the Sea (1924) – Chief Henchman
 Breed of the Border (1924) – Sheriff Wells
 Fighting Youth (1925) – 'Murdering' Mooney
 The Wild Bull's Lair (1925) – Eagle Eye
 Wild Justice (1925) – Bob Blake, the Villain
 The New Champion (1925) – 'Knockout' Riley
 Big Pal (1925) – Bill Hogan
 Hogan's Alley (1925) – The Battling Savage
 Braveheart (1925) – Ki-Yote
 The Sea Beast (1926) – Daggoo
 The Two-Gun Man (1926) – Bowie Bill
 The Fighting Marine (1926)
 Lone Hand Saunders (1926) – Buck
 The Ice Flood (1926) – Pete the Bully
 The Winning Wallop (1926) – 'Pug' Brennan
 Fangs of Justice (1926) – Walter Page
 The General (1926) – Confederate Recruiter
 The Last Trail (1927) – Henchman Cal Barker
 All Aboard (1927) – Ali Ben Ome
 The Frontiersman (1927) – White Snake
 One-Round Hogan (1927) – 'Big Joe' Morgan
 On Your Toes (1927) – Mello
 Her Wild Oat (1927) – Workman
 The Rawhide Kid (1928) – J. Francis Jackson
 Burning Daylight (1928) – Johnson
 Midnight Madness (1928) – Harris – Childers' Henchman
 The Charge of the Gauchos (1928) – Goyenecha
 Free Lips (1928) – Bill Dugan
 Vultures of the Sea (1928) – Bull Marlow
 Show Girl (1928) – Private Detective
 Power (1928) – Job Foreman
 Through the Breakers (1928) – Gamboa
 The Glorious Trail (1928) – Gus Lynch
 Broken Barriers (1928) – James Barker
 Captain Lash (1929) – Bull Hawks
 Masked Emotions (1929) – Lagune
 Oh, Yeah! (1929) – Hot Foot
 Her Man (1930) – Henchman Hank
 Billy the Kid (1930) – Bert Grant
 River's End (1930) – Mountie
 The Phantom of the West (1931) – Sheriff Jim H. Ryan
 The Criminal Code (1931) – Prison Guard in Yard
 No Limit (1931) – Battling Hannon
 Fighting Caravans (1931) – Renegade
 Sit Tight (1931) – Olaf
 Hell Bound (1931) – Hood
 The Squaw Man (1931) – Deputy Clark
 I Like Your Nerve (1931) – Rocci – Assassin
 Reckless Living (1931) – Henchman
 The Champ (1931) – Manuel Quiroga – Mexican Champ
 A House Divided (1931) – Big Bill
 The Airmail Mystery (1932) – Moran
 The Rider of Death Valley (1932) – Gambler
 Tom Brown of Culver (1932) – Fight Manager
 Ride Him, Cowboy (1932) – Henry Sims – aka The Hawk
 Pack Up Your Troubles (1932) – Doughboy
 The All American (1932) – Hop McComb
 The Golden West (1932) – Chief Grey Eagle
 If I Had a Million (1932) – Mike – Carnival Bouncer
 You Said a Mouthful (1932) – Holt's Manager
 Fast Life (1932) – Henchman
 Face in the Sky (1933) – Minor Role
 Parachute Jumper (1933) – Marine
 Terror Aboard (1933) – First Mate
 Song of the Eagle (1933) – Flynn, a Henchman
 Hold Your Man (1933) – Policeman Arresting Ruby
 I Love That Man (1933) – Frank – Label's Henchman
 Tillie and Gus (1933) – Jury Foreman
 The Chief (1933) – Fireman
 Sitting Pretty (1933) – Bar Bouncer
 Dancing Lady (1933) – Policeman
 Roman Scandals (1933) – Lucius – Josephus' Charioteer
 The Meanest Gal in Town (1934) – Angry Truck Driver
 The House of Rothschild (1934) – Man in 1780 Sequence
 Honor of the Range (1934) – Boots
 All Men Are Enemies (1934) – Australian Drunk
 Green Eyes (1934) – Motorcycle Policeman
 The Red Rider (1934, Serial) – Barfly (Ch. 1)
 I Give My Love (1934) – Burly Soldier
 Treasure Island (1934) – Pirate
 6 Day Bike Rider (1934) – Referee
 The Mighty Barnum (1934) – Teamster
 The Best Man Wins (1935) – Bouncer
 Naughty Marietta (1935) – Mercenary Scout
 Les Misérables (1935) – Galley Prisoner
 The Informer (1935) – Policeman
 The Daring Young Man (1935) – Convict
 Western Frontier (1935) – Link
 Diamond Jim (1935) – Mug
 Thunderbolt (1935) – Deputy Blackie
 The Adventures of Frank Merriwell (1936, Serial) – Slout
 Valley of the Lawless (1936) – Garlow
 Modern Times (1936) – Shipbuilder
 Here Comes Trouble (1936) – Ox
 Robin Hood of El Dorado (1936) – Deputy Phil
 Heroes of the Range (1936) – Lightning Smith
 Gun Grit (1936) – Henry Hess
 Parole! (1936) – Truck Driver
 Wildcat Trooper (1936) – Jim Foster
 Kelly the Second (1936) – Louie
 Wild Horse Round-Up (1936) – Steve
 The Black Coin (1936, Serial) – Purcell – Henchman [Chs. 11–14]
 The Big Broadcast of 1937 (1936) – Cowboy
 The Magnificent Brute (1936) – Worker
 Ghost-Town Gold (1936) – Wild Man Kamatski
 Wild Horse Round-Up (1936) – Henchman Steve Clark
 Conflict (1936) – Mike Malone
 The Plough and the Stars (1936)
 A Man Betrayed (1936) – Roundhouse
 Secret Valley (1937) – Brodie – Henchman
 Woman-Wise (1937) – Fighter
 You Only Live Once (1937) – Plainclothesman
 Park Avenue Logger (1937) – Logger
 Night Key (1937) – Henchman
 The Prince and the Pauper (1937) – Beggar
 Behind the Headlines (1937) – Gang Member
 Hollywood Cowboy (1937) – Gillie – Henchman
 Riders of the Dawn (1937) – Henchman Butch
 Windjammer (1937) – Slum
 Big City (1937) – Comet Cab Driver
 Madame X (1937) – Jailer
 Saturday's Heroes (1937) – Trainer Giving Rubdown
 Clipped Wings (1937) – Terrell
 Sh! The Octopus (1937) – Sinister Plotter
 Wise Girl (1937) – Mike's Fight Opponent
 The Bad Man of Brimstone (1937) – Horntoad
 Walking Down Broadway (1938) – Baggage Man
 The Secret of Treasure Island (1938, Serial) – Ambulance Driver
 The Adventures of Robin Hood (1938) – Man-at-Arms
 Professor Beware (1938) – Sailor
 Army Girl (1938) – Soldier
 Dick Tracy Returns (1938, Serial) – Silm
 Mysterious Mr. Moto (1938) – Bouncer at Purple Peter
 Stablemates (1938) – Poolroom Owner
 The Spider's Web (1938, Serial) – Henchman
 The Storm (1938) – Brawler
 Angels with Dirty Faces (1938) – Sharpie
 Up the River (1938) – Guard
 Devil's Island (1939) – Guard
 Flying G-Men (1939, Serial) – Henchman
 Pardon Our Nerve (1939) – Gunboat Briggs
 Mandrake the Magician (1939, Serial) – Harris
 The Kid from Kokomo (1939) – Old Man in Fistfight
 Unmarried (1939) – Second Referee
 Captain Fury (1939) – Guard #3
 It Could Happen to You (1939) – Burglar
 Timber Stampede (1939) – Champ – Henchman
 Tower of London (1939) – Soldier
 The Shadow (1940, Serial) – Cranston's Kidnapper
 The Invisible Man Returns (1940) – Bill
 The Man from Dakota (1940) – Wagon Guard
 Northwest Passage (1940) – Capt. Grant
 Midnight Limited (1940) – Detective Joe O'Neill
 Son of the Navy (1940) – Vegetable Truck Driver
 Dark Command (1940) – Tough Yankee #2
 Boom Town (1940) – Man Abandoned by Whitey
 Rangers of Fortune (1940) – Townsman
 Tugboat Annie Sails Again (1940) – Stranded Ship's Engineer
 Seven Sinners (1940) – 'Junior' – Antros Henchman
 Melody Ranch (1940) – Man Who Asks for Quiet
 Gallant Sons (1940) – Card Player Who Doesn't Know French
 South of Suez (1940) – Miner
 Misbehaving Husbands (1940) – Gooch Mulligan
 The Green Hornet Strikes Again! (1940, Serial) – Warehouse Truck Loader
 The Lone Rider Rides On (1941) – Frank Mitchell
 The Lone Rider Crosses the Rio (1941) – Henchman Marty
 Mr. District Attorney (1941) – Henchman
 Federal Fugitives (1941) – Henchman Butch
 The Lone Rider in Ghost Town (1941) – O'Shea
 Billy the Kid (1941) – Man in Saloon
 The Get-Away (1941) – Prison Guard Bringing Crane to Warden
 Law of the Range (1941) – Deputy
 Desperate Cargo (1941) – Butch, the Bouncher
 Dr. Jekyll and Mr. Hyde (1941) – Drunk
 The Lone Rider Ambushed (1941) – Blackie Dawson
 The Smiling Ghost (1941) – Ryan
 Unexpected Uncle (1941) – Truck Driver
 Man at Large (1941) – Dancehall Patron with Picture
 Mr. Celebrity (1941) – Patrick J. Dugan – Private Detective
 The Lone Rider Fights Back (1941) – George Clarke
 The Corsican Brothers (1941) – Torture Cell Guard
 Swamp Woman (1941) – Guard
 Among the Living (1941) – Neighbor
 Texas Man Hunt (1942) – Walter Jensen
 Broadway Big Shot (1942) – Butch
 Captain Midnight (1942, Serial) – Henchman
 Too Many Women (1942) – Laborer
 Reap the Wild Wind (1942) – Cutler Man in Barrell Room
 True to the Army (1942) – Torchy
 House of Errors (1942) – Black
 Juke Box Jenny (1942) – Cabbie
 This Time for Keeps (1942) – Electrical Lineman
 Sunday Punch (1942) – Dennis Riley – First Referee
 My Favorite Spy (1942) – Kelly's Patron
 In Old California (1942) – Angry Citizen in Lynch Mob
 Men of Texas (1942) – Road Agent
 Tumbleweed Trail (1942) – Sheriff
 Timber (1942) – Lumberjack
 Boss of Hangtown Mesa (1942) – Town Tough
 The Glass Key (1942) – Strongarm Thug Escorting Sloss
 Tomorrow We Live (1942) – Kohler
 Sin Town (1942) – Bartender
 Gentleman Jim (1942) – Mug
 The McGuerins from Brooklyn (1942) – Savoy Hotel Doorman
 Tennessee Johnson (1942) – Heckler
 Stand by for Action (1942) – Sailor
 Corregidor (1943) – Lieutenant #2
 Don Winslow of the Coast Guard (1943, Serial) – Henchman Muller [Ch. 13]
 She Has What It Takes (1943) – Trainer
 Calling Wild Bill Elliott (1943) – Henchman
 Hitler's Madman (1943) – Engineer
 Two Tickets to London (1943) – Second Mate
 The Man from Down Under (1943) – Military Policeman
 The Renegade (1943) – Henchman Saunders
 Blazing Frontier (1943) – Sheriff Ward Tragg
 Crazy House (1943) – Studio Cop
 Swing Fever (1943) – Bag Puncher
 The Lodger (1944) – Policeman
 Shine On, Harvest Moon (1944) – Bouncer
 The Adventures of Mark Twain (1944) – Crew Chief
 Once Upon a Time (1944) – Assistant Cyclist
 Detective Kitty O'Day (1944) – Spike
 Meet the People (1944) – Shipyard Gateman
 Louisiana Hayride (1944) – Bartender in Film
 The Seventh Cross (1944) – Man on Street
 Frenchman's Creek (1944) – Cornishman
 Lost in a Harem (1944) – Majordomo
 Music for Millions (1944) – Policeman
 Destiny (1944) – Third Motorcycle Cop
 Can't Help Singing (1944) – Gunman
 The Man in Half Moon Street (1945) – Bobby
 The Big Show-Off (1945) – Rude Night Club Patron
 Bring on the Girls (1945) – Flunky
 The Power of the Whistler (1945) – Man Delivering Cake
 It's in the Bag (1945) – Nightclub Tough in Fight
 Flame of Barbary Coast (1945) – Morell Henchman
 Along Came Jones (1945) – Townsman
 Scotland Yard Investigator (1945) – Constable
 Abbott and Costello in Hollywood (1945) – Cop
 Senorita from the West (1945) – Moving Man
 Kitty (1945) – Stevedore
 Confidential Agent (1945) – Miner
 Saratoga Trunk (1945) – Soule Gang Leader
 Adventure (1945) – Boss
 Girl on the Spot (1946) – Mug
 The Kid from Brooklyn (1946) – Arena Usher
 Two Sisters from Boston (1946) – Stagehand
 Night in Paradise (1946) – Townsperson
 Easy to Wed (1946) – Truck Driver
 The Verdict (1946) – Ex-Pugilist Juryman
 It's a Wonderful Life (1946) – Potter's bodyguard
 California (1947) – Stranger
 The Sea of Grass (1947) – Poker Game Spectator
 The Imperfect Lady (1947) – Man With Travers
 Too Many Winners (1947) – Joe
 Unconquered (1947) – Jake – Bartender
 Wild Harvest (1947) – Alperson Crew Member
 The Wistful Widow of Wagon Gap (1947) – Barfly
 Road to Rio (1947) – Roustabout
 The Big Clock (1948) – Ice Man
 River Lady (1948) – Sands
 Feudin', Fussin' and A-Fightin' (1948) – Townsman
 Superman (1948, Serial) – Car 1 Henchman
 The Babe Ruth Story (1948) – Doorman
 A Southern Yankee (1948) – Horseman
 Night Has a Thousand Eyes (1948) – Truckman
 Johnny Belinda (1948) – Man Reciting Lord's Prayer
 Harpoon (1948) – Big Red Dorsett
 An Innocent Affair (1948) – Mover
 The Three Musketeers (1948) – Executioner of Lyons
 The Untamed Breed (1948) – Rancher
 Kiss the Blood Off My Hands (1948) – Seaman
 Thunder in the Pines (1948) – Lumberjack in Saloon
 Joan of Arc (1948) – Soldier #3
 Whispering Smith (1948) – Frank – Wrecking Crew Member
 The Paleface (1948) – Greg
 I Shot Jesse James (1949) – Livery Stableman
 Knock on Any Door (1949) – Suspect
 The Fighting O'Flynn (1949) – Soldier
 Fighting Fools (1949) – Tough Customer Tearing Up Program
 Tulsa (1949) – Doorman at Gambling Emporium
 Streets of Laredo (1949) – Texas Ranger
 Grand Canyon (1949) – Henchman #2
 Batman and Robin (1949, Serial) – Plant Guard [Ch. 14]
 The Beautiful Blonde from Bashful Bend (1949) – Hoodlum
 The Big Steal (1949) – Madden the Guard
 Reign of Terror (1949) – Bakery Guard
 All the King's Men (1949) – Stark Strong-Arm Man
 On the Town (1949) – Policeman
 Samson and Delilah (1949) – Gristmill Guard
 The Yellow Cab Man (1950) – Truck Driver
 Appointment with Danger (1950) – Motorcycle Cop
 Kill the Umpire (1950) – Guard
 Lucky Losers (1950) – Joe
 Fortunes of Captain Blood (1950) – Guard
 Atom Man vs. Superman (1950, Serial) – Impatient Man at Bridge [Ch. 1]
 Triple Trouble (1950) – Convict
 Silver Raiders (1950) – Steve – Mine Guard
 South Sea Sinner (1950) – Minor Role
 Let's Dance (1950) – Police Sergeant
 Copper Canyon (1950) – Travis Man
 Blues Busters (1950) – Joe, the Bouncer
 Stage to Tucson (1950) – Territorial Townsman
 Soldiers Three (1951) – Scot
 Santa Fe (1951) – Railroad Worker
 The Scarf (1951) – Floozy's Boyfriend
 The Lady and the Bandit (1951) – Turpin's Hangman
 Here Comes the Groom (1951) – Passenger on Airplane
 Anne of the Indies (1951) – Pirate on Molly O'Brien
 The Son of Dr. Jekyll (1951) – Man in Bar
 Man in the Saddle (1951) – Ned Bale
 Captain Video: Master of the Stratosphere (1951, Serial) – Henchman [Ch. 14]
 My Favorite Spy (1951) – Camel-Herder
 Scandal Sheet (1952) – Onlooker at Murder Scene
 The Big Trees (1952) – Glen – Lumberman with Rifle
 The Pace That Thrills (1952) – Race Flagman
 Aaron Slick from Punkin Crick (1952) – Oil Driller
 The San Francisco Story (1952) – Palmer
 Cripple Creek (1952) – Gold Smelter
 The Duel at Silver Creek (1952) – Will
 Limelight (1952) – Extra in Dress Circle
 Hangman's Knot (1952) – Drifter
 Hans Christian Andersen (1952) – Townsman
 Botany Bay (1952) – Guard
 Kansas Pacific (1953) – Workman
 A Perilous Journey (1953) – Miner
 Hannah Lee (1953) – Fred
 The Last Posse (1953) – Posse Rider Cord
 Ride, Vaquero! (1953) – Bartender
 The Stranger Wore a Gun (1953) – Deputy Sheriff
 The Wild One (1953) – Official
 Ride Clear of Diablo (1954) – Miner
 Riot in Cell Block 11 (1954) – Convict Roberts
 Rose Marie (1954) – Woodsman in Saloon
 Demetrius and the Gladiators (1954) – Guard
 King Richard and the Crusaders (1954) – Mobster
 Three Hours to Kill (1954) – Cass
 The Human Jungle (1954) – Minor Role
 The Silver Chalice (1954) – Ruffian
 Abbott and Costello Meet the Keystone Kops (1955) – Usher / Ticket Taker
 Timberjack (1955) – Barfly
 Stranger on Horseback (1955) – Bartender
 Wyoming Renegades (1955) – Jones
 A Bullet for Joey (1955) – Nightclub Bartender
 Wichita (1955) – Barfly / Lookout
 Jail Busters (1955) – Frank – Barber
 A Man Alone (1955) – Dorfman
 Lucy Gallant (1955) – Townsman
 Teen-Age Crime Wave (1955) – Juvenile Court Bailiff
 The Spoilers (1955) – Sourdough at Hearing
 A Lawless Street (1955) – Dingo Brion
 Invasion of the Body Snatchers (1956) – Townsman
 Fury at Gunsight Pass (1956) – Townsman
 Crashing Las Vegas (1956) – Guard
 The Harder They Fall (1956) – Referee
 The Rawhide Years (1956) – Riverboat Passenger
 Gun Brothers (1956) – Trapper
 Showdown at Abilene (1956) – Roughneck
 The Ten Commandments (1956) – Hebrew at Golden Calf
 Friendly Persuasion (1956) – Lemonade Vendor
 The Desperados Are in Town (1956) – Bartender / Bouncer
 Zombies of Mora Tau (1957) – Capt. Peters
 The Phantom Stagecoach (1957) – Rider
 The Guns of Fort Petticoat (1957) – Blacksmith
 The Kettles on Old MacDonald's Farm (1957) – Townsman
 Public Pigeon No. 1 (1957) – Convict
 Gunfight at the O.K. Corral (1957) – Bartender
 3:10 to Yuma (1957) – Townsman in Contention
 Baby Face Nelson (1957) – Plant Guard
 The Hard Man (1957) – Posse Man
 Return to Warbow (1958) – Convict
 Hell's Five Hours (1958) – Guard
 The Buccaneer (1958) – Baratarian Pirate
 The Hanging Tree (1959) – Townsman
 Last Train from Gun Hill (1959) – Craig's Man Waiting in Horseshoe
 The Jayhawkers! (1959) – Jayhawker
 Ride the High Country (1962) – Miner
 Come Blow Your Horn (1963) – Bit Role
 Donovan's Reef (1963) – Chief Petty Officer
 McLintock! (1963) – Elmer – Bartender
 Apache Rifles (1964) – Townsman
 The Rare Breed (1966) – Cattle Buyer
 The Silencers (1966) – Drunk
 The Fastest Guitar Alive (1967) – Drunk

References

Bibliography

External links

 
 

1884 births
1973 deaths
Australian male silent film actors
Male actors from Sydney
20th-century Australian male actors
Burials at Forest Lawn Memorial Park (Glendale)
Australian expatriates in the United States